Cicindela hirticollis is a species of tiger beetle that is commonly found in sand bars and sandy beaches, is medium-sized, is about  long, and is active in the summer. The dorsal surfaces of the head, prothorax, and elytra are dark brown. The elytral markings are very light-colored cream or white. The species' common names are hairy-necked tiger beetle and moustached tiger beetle. Its population is in decline.

References

External links

hirticollis
Beetles described in 1817